Aaj Ka Robin Hood (Translation: Today's Robin Hood) is a 1988 Indian Hindi adventure-drama film directed and produced by Tapan Sinha. It stars Anil Chatterjee, Utpal Dutt, Nana Patekar, Rabi Ghosh and Satish Shah in lead roles. Music for the film was also scored by Tapan Sinha.

The shooting of the film was done in Ranka Palace, Garhwa, Jharkhand. The film won the 1988 Berlin International Film Festival award under UNICEF Jury Commendation.

Cast 
 Utpal Dutt as Ram S. Jadhav
 Nana Patekar as  Ramdulaare S. Jadhav
 Rabi Ghosh
 Satish Shah as Ramdas S. Jadhav
 Anil Chatterjee
 Ritesh Talwar as Tetra Chedi Tushar
 Master Ravi as Ramkishan Ram Jadhav

References

External links 
 

1988 films
1990s Hindi-language films
Indian adventure drama films
1980s Hindi-language films
1980s adventure drama films
1988 drama films
Robin Hood films
Films based on medieval legends